Yury Anatolyevich Ponomaryov (24 March 1932 – 13 April 2005) was a Russian cosmonaut.

He married fellow cosmonaut Valentina Ponomaryova in 1972 and the couple had two children before divorcing. As with Valentina, Yuri did not get to fly into space although he did serve on the Soyuz 18 backup crew.

References

1932 births
2005 deaths
People from Nerchinsky District
Russian cosmonauts
Soviet cosmonauts